Almada Forum is the third largest shopping center in Portugal and in the Iberian Peninsula. It is situated in Vale de Mourelos, in the  freguesia  of Feijó and municipality of Almada. It opened in 2002 and has a total leasable space of 78,815 m2

It hosts 262 shops, including a big supermarket (Auchan) and 35 restaurants. Almada Forum stretches over three floors.

In 2018, Spanish Merlin Properties bought Almada Forum for 406.7 million Euros.

Awards 

2003 - Best Shopping center in Europe
2004 - Full Design and Development Award - Best Shopping Center of the World 2004, by ICSC - 28ª edition of International Council of Shopping Centers

External links 
 

Shopping centers in Portugal